McCabe's Guitar Shop is a musical instrument store and live music venue on Pico Boulevard in Santa Monica, California, United States. Opened in 1958 by Gerald L. McCabe, a well-known furniture designer. McCabe's specializes in acoustic and folk instruments, including guitars, banjos, mandolins, dulcimers, fiddles, ukuleles, psaltries, bouzoukis, sitars, ouds, and ethnic percussion. Since 1969, McCabe's has also been a noted forum for folk concerts.

Concerts at McCabe's

The decor at McCabe's is stripped down, with concerts being given in a back room with folding chairs and walls covered with vintage guitars, banjos, ukuleles and other instruments. A poll by LA Observed rated McCabe's as one of the 32 greatest things about Los Angeles. In The Guide prepared by the Los Angeles Times, McCabe's is described as "an achingly intimate room" with a "bare-bones setting" featuring "the best guitar music west of the 405 Freeway." The Guide continues: "Legends, traveling minstrels and local talent—they all seem to pass through McCabe's at some point. They may be there to get their guitars fixed; the club has a day job as one of the oldest stringed instrument stores in the city." Frommer's describes the McCabe's experience as "intimate in the extreme; the gig would have to be in your living room to get any cozier." The Metromix guide to Los Angeles calls McCabe's "a mild-mannered guitar/stringed instrument shop by day" that "opens up as a world-class concert venue by night." At full capacity the concert room holds 150.

McCabe's is owned by Robert and Esperanza Riskin. Robert is the son of actress Fay Wray and Robert Riskin (screenwriter of "It Happened One Night").

Performers

The list of past performers includes:

 Mose Allison
 Altan
 Dave Alvin
 The Aman Folk Orchestra
 Alistair Anderson
 Chet Atkins
 Ginger Baker
 Battlefield Band
 Beck
 Pierre Bensusan
 Krishna Bhatt
 The Blind Boys of Alabama
 Frank Black
 Norman Blake
 Blanche
 Michael Bloomfield
 Eric Bogle
 Boys of the Lough
 Paul Brady
 David Bromberg
 Jackson Browne
 Kevin Burke & Michael O'Domhnaill
 T Bone Burnett
 J. J. Cale
 John Cale
 Capercaillie
 Liz Carroll & John Doyle
 Lori Carson
 Dave Carter and Tracy Grammer
 Martin Carthy
 Peter Case
 Exene Cervenka
 Alex Chilton
 Clannad
 Gene Clark
 Shawn Colvin
 Elizabeth Cotten
 Cowboy Junkies
 Marshall Crenshaw
 Evan Dando
 De Dannan
 John Densmore
 The Dillards
 John Doe
 Hamza El Din
 Steve Earle
 Joe Ely
 Fairport Convention
 Archie Fisher
 Black Francis
 Glenn Frey
 Bill Frisell
 Dick Gaughan
 Giant Sand
 Vince Gill
 Steve Gillette
 Jimmie Dale Gilmore
 Allen Ginsberg
 Tracy Grammer
 Arlo Guthrie
 Dirk Hamilton
 John Wesley Harding
 PJ Harvey
 Richie Havens
 John Hiatt
 Dan Hicks
 Chris Hillman
 Robyn Hitchcock
 Camper Van Beethoven
 John Lee Hooker
 Hot Tuna
 Andy Irvine
 Jefferson Starship
 Paul Kantner
 Bobby Kimmel
 Klezmorim
 Neil Innes
 The Incredible String Band
 I See Hawks In LA
 Bert Jansch
 Jorma Kaukonen
 Dolores Keane
 Paul Kelly
 Steve Kilbey
 Al Kooper
 Krysia Krystianne
 Timothy Leary
 David Lindley
 Mance Lipscomb
 Nils Lofgren
 Long Ryders
 Longbranch Pennywhistle
 Ewan MacColl & Peggy Seeger
 Taj Mahal
 Ray Manzarek
 Aimee Mann
 John Martyn
 J Mascis
 Mary Lee and Nancy
 Mary McCaslin
 The Del McCoury Band
 Joe & Antoinette McKenna
 Paula McMath
 James McMurtry
 Minutemen
 Joni Mitchell
 Mick Moloney
 Bob Mould
 Maria Muldaur
 Muzsikas
 Michael Nesmith
 Tracy Newman
 The Nields
 Nitty Gritty Dirt Band
 Mojo Nixon
 Laura Nyro
 Maura O’Connell
 Odetta
 Liam O’Flynn & Donal Lunny
 Herb Ohta
 Old Blind Dogs
 Carla Olson
 Van Dyke Parks
 Patrick Street
 Tom Paxton
 Pentangle
 Liz Phair
 Sam Phillips
 Utah Phillips
 Plimsouls
 Maddy Prior
 Kenny Rankin
 R.E.M.
 Jean Redpath
 Redwood
 John Renbourn
 Stan Ridgway
 Stan Rogers
 Roy Rogers
 Linda Ronstadt
 Tom Rush
 Rick Ruskin
 Martin Sexton
 Billy Joe Shaver
 Michelle Shocked
 Jane Siberry
 Silly Wizard
 Spinal Tap
 Jody Stecher
 Al Stewart
 Andy Stewart & Gerry O’Beirne
 Sun Ra
 Lyle Ritz
 John David Souther
 June Tabor
 Tannahill Weavers
 Jack Tempchin
 They Might Be Giants
 Richard Thompson
 Russ Tolman
 Train to Sligo
 Venice
 Tom Verlaine
 Loudon Wainwright III
 Tom Waits
 M. Ward
 The Watersons
 Doc Watson
 Lucinda Williams
 Robin Williamson
 Nancy Wilson
 George Winston
 Gabriel Yacoub
 J. D. Crowe & The New South
 Dream Syndicate

Live at McCabe's: Live albums recorded at McCabe's
In the mid-1970s Takoma Records had offices two doors east of McCabes and built a recording studio, with audio and video cables going from the sound booth at McCabes to the control room of the studio, which allowed easy recording of concerts. These master live recordings now reside within the McCabe's Guitar Shop Collection at the University of North Carolina at Chapel Hill's Southern Folklife Collection. Numerous artists have also recorded live albums at McCabe's (some of which were recorded using Takoma Studios from the mid-1970s to early 1980s) including:

Norman Blake: Live at McCabe's released in 1976
Mike Bloomfield I'm With You Always (Recorded 1977, Benchmark Recordings)
 Byron Berline: Live at McCabe's released in 1978
Maria Muldaur Gospel Nights (with the Chambers Brothers) (1980, Takoma Records, TAK-7084) 
Ted Hawkins: The Final Tour (1998, Evidence Music)
Townes Van Zandt: Live at McCabe's recorded in 1995
Ralph Stanley: Live at McCabe's Guitar Shop 2-11-01
 Tom Paxton: Live at McCabe's Guitar Shop recorded in 1991
 Henry Rollins: Live at McCabe's recorded June 1990
 Robin Williamson: Merry Band's Farewell Concert at McCabe's recorded in 1979
Nancy Wilson (from Heart): Live at McCabe's Guitar Shop released in 1999
 Freedy Johnston: Live at McCabe's Guitar Shop released in 1998

 John Stewart: Deep in the Neon: Live at McCabe's released in 1991
 Chris Smither: Chris Smither Live at McCabe's Guitar Shop 3/14/03
David Hatfield: David Hatfield Live at McCabe's released in 2003
 Lyle Ritz & Herb Ohta: A Night of Ukulele Jazz Live at McCabe's recorded in 2000 
 Paul Siebel: Live at McCabe's released in 1981
 Batdorf & Rodney: Live at McCabe's 1975
 Gene Clark & Carla Olson - Silhouetted In Light

Pianist George Winston recorded a song, "Blues in G," at McCabe's in 1975. It was later released as a bonus track of the expanded edition of his first album, Piano Solos (George Winston album).

A bootleg recording was also made of R.E.M.: Live at McCabe's Guitar Shop in 1987, some of which have appeared as legitimate B-sides.

Bruce Springsteen joined John Wesley Harding onstage at a show to help sing Springsteen's "Wreck on the Highway," which later turned up on a Harding release.

Numerous audience tapes circulate of McCabe's performances, and several soundboards, including a set by T Bone Burnett in December 1993 that featured the Williams Brothers, Maria McKee and a cover of Dolly Parton's "I Will Always Love You." It also featured "My Life and the Women Who Lived It." Days later, Burnett performed at Rockpalast in Europe and claimed that "My Life..." was written on the flight to Europe. That was clearly not true.

John Hiatt sang many of his songs from "Bring the Family" at several McCabe's shows just prior to recording that album. Those songs included "Memphis in the Meantime," "You Dad Did" and "Lipstick Sunset," among others. McCabe's booker at the time, John Chelew, produced "Bring the Family," which was recorded in four days and became Haitt's best-known album.

References

Further reading

External links

Official McCabe's Site
Yelp: McCabe's Guitar Shop
KCRW - McCabe's at 50
Bob Riskin Interview NAMM Oral History Program (2013)

Musical instrument retailers of the United States
Buildings and structures in Santa Monica, California
Music venues in Los Angeles
Entertainment companies based in California
Retail companies based in California
Companies based in Santa Monica, California
American companies established in 1958
Entertainment companies established in 1958
Retail companies established in 1958
1958 establishments in California
Tourist attractions in Santa Monica, California